Black Swans and Wormhole Wizards is the thirteenth studio album by guitarist Joe Satriani, released on October 5, 2010 through Epic Records.

Release and touring
Recording for Black Swans and Wormhole Wizards took place between June and August 2010 and the title was announced on August 20. A podcast of each track was put up on Satriani's official Facebook profile and YouTube channel leading up to the album's release, with "Light Years Away" being released as a free MP3 single download on September 7, 2010 in exchange for the customer advertising it in a Facebook post or Twitter tweet. Two bonus tracks, "Heartbeat" and "Longing", were made available through Best Buy and Napster.

Touring began in Europe from October to November, followed by North America in December to January 2011.

Critical reception

Stephen Thomas Erlewine at AllMusic gave Black Swans and Wormhole Wizards three stars out of five, calling it "a mature work from one of the great rock guitarists" and "pure guitar prog, filled with compressed boogies, sci-fi synths, exotic flourishes, and all of Satch's phasers and flangers in full-tilt overdrive."

The album reached No. 45 on the U.S. Billboard 200 and remained on that chart for two weeks, as well as reaching the top 100 in ten other countries.

Track listing

Personnel
Joe Satriani – guitar, keyboard, bass, engineering, production
Mike Keneally – keyboard
Jeff Campitelli – drums, percussion
Allen Whitman – bass
Mike Fraser – engineering, mixing, production
Mike Boden – engineering, digital editing
Dann Michael Thompson – engineering assistance
Judy Kirschner – engineering assistance
Eric Mosher – additional editing, mixing
George Marino – mastering

Charts

References

External links
Black Swans and Wormhole Wizards at satriani.com
Interview with Joe Satriani at Ultimate Guitar

Joe Satriani albums
2010 albums
Epic Records albums
Albums produced by Mike Fraser